Euwallacea similis, is a species of weevil native in the Oriental region through to Australia but shows a cosmopolitan distribution due to introduction to many parts of the world.

Distribution
The native range of the species include: Bangladesh, Bhutan, Cambodia, China, India, Andaman and Nicobar Islands, Indonesia (Java, Maluku Islands, Sulawesi, Sumatra), Laos, Malaysia, Myanmar, Nepal, Pakistan, Philippines, Singapore, Sri Lanka, Taiwan, Thailand, Vietnam, Australia, Papua New Guinea and Solomon Islands.

It is introduced to many African, European and American countries particularly through timber and wood commodities. This exotic range includes: Cameroon, Egypt, Kenya, Mauritania, Mauritius, Seychelles, South Africa, Tanzania, Cocos Islands, Bonin Islands, Jordan, United States, Christmas Island, Micronesia, Fiji, French Polynesia, Guam, Kiribati, Marshall Islands, New Caledonia, Northern Mariana Islands, Palau and Samoa.

Description
Body length of the female ranges from 2.2 to 2.7 mm. Frons convex, and entire surface is minutely reticulate with faint, shallow punctures. Pronotum sides are nearly straight whereas the anterior margin is broadly rounded, and without serrations. Elytral apex is narrowly rounded and the elytral declivity is sloping, and convex. There is a large, distinct tubercle located on lower third in interspace 1. Elytral interspace 7 is acutely elevated, and very weakly crenulate.

Biology & control
A highly polyphagous species, it is known from diverse array of host plants. Due to being a secondary borer, it is considered as a high-risk quarantine pest. They show inbreeding, where the males usually mating with their sisters within the parental gallery system before dispersal. Adults are known to attack small branches and seedlings to large logs as well as stressed, dying, dead or felled trees. It is particularly common in disturbed areas and flies mainly around dusk, and can be attracted to light in large numbers easily. The gallery system consists of branching tunnels in one transverse plane. Brood chambers are not found at the cambial level or within the wood. Eggs are laid, and the larvae develop and pupate within the same gallery system. Both parent female and the larvae feed on the ambrosia fungus such as Ambrosiella which are growing on the walls of the galleries. The fungus is transmitted by the female in a mycangium.

Adults can be controlled by natural predators such as lizards, clerid beetles and ants as they attempt to bore into the host tree. Immature stages are susceptible for both predators and parasitoids.

Host plants

 Acacia crassicarpa
 Agathis
 Artocarpus integer
 Boswellia serrata
 Bruguiera parviflora
 Camellia sinensis
 Cocos nucifera
 Dipterocarpus baudii
 Dryobalanops aromatica
 Durio zibethinus
 Erythrina subumbrans
 Falcataria moluccana
 Ficus religiosa
 Hevea brasiliensis
 Intsia palembanica
 Mangifera indica
 Manihot glaziovii
 Pometia pinnata
 Pterocarpus indicus
 Rhizophora mucronata
 Shorea leprosula
 Styrax benzoin
 Syzygium cumini
 Tectona grandis
 Terminalia bellirica
 Theobroma cacao

References 

Curculionidae
Insects of Sri Lanka
Beetles described in 1953